Nelson may refer to:

Arts and entertainment
 Nelson (1918 film), a historical film directed by Maurice Elvey
 Nelson (1926 film), a historical film directed by Walter Summers
 Nelson (opera), an opera by Lennox Berkeley to a libretto by Alan Pryce-Jones
 Nelson (band), an American rock band
 Nelson, a 2010 album by Paolo Conte

People
 Nelson (surname), including a list of people with the name
 Nelson (given name), including a list of people with the name
 Horatio Nelson, 1st Viscount Nelson (1758–1805), British admiral
 Nelson Mandela, the first black South African president

Fictional characters
 Alice Nelson, the housekeeper on the TV series The Brady Bunch
 Dave Nelson, a main character on the TV series NewsRadio
 Emma Nelson, on the TV series Degrassi: The Next Generation
 Foggy Nelson, law partner of Matt Murdock in the Marvel Comic Universe
 Greg Nelson, on the American soap opera All My Children
 Harriman Nelson, on the TV series Voyage to the Bottom of the Sea
 Melody Nelson, from the concept album Histoire de Melody Nelson
 Tony Nelson, a main character on the TV series I Dream of Jeannie
 Nelson Muntz, on the television series The Simpsons

Places

Australia
 Nelson, New South Wales
 Nelson, Victoria

Canada
 Nelson, British Columbia
 Nelson (provincial electoral district), British Columbia, 1916–1931
 Nelson Parish, New Brunswick
 Nelson-Miramichi, New Brunswick, a former village, now part of Miramichi
 Nelson Beach, Saskatchewan
 Nelson Head, Northwest Territories
 Nelson Island (British Columbia)
 Nelson River, Manitoba

New Zealand
 Nelson, New Zealand, a city
 Nelson Lakes National Park, South Island

United Kingdom
 Nelson, Lancashire, England
 Nelson, Caerphilly, Wales
 Nelson's Column, in Trafalgar Square, London

United States
 Nelson, Alabama
 Nelson, California
 Nelson, Georgia
 Nelson, Illinois
 Nelson, Minnesota
 Nelson, Missouri
 Nelson, Nebraska
 Nelson, Nevada
 Nelson, New Hampshire
 Nelson, New York
 Nelson, North Carolina
 Nelson, Oklahoma
 Nelson, West Virginia
 Nelson, Wisconsin, a village
 Nelson (town), Wisconsin, adjacent to the village
 Nelson, Virginia

Other places
 Nelson's Island, Egypt
 Nelson's Pillar, former monument in Dublin, Ireland
 Nelsons Island or Nelson Island, British Indian Ocean Territory
 Nelson County (disambiguation)
 Nelson Township (disambiguation)

Electoral divisions/districts 

 Nelson (electoral district), House of Commons of Canada, 1917–1935
 Nelson Province (Australia), Victorian Legislative Council, 1882–1940
 Nelson (provincial electoral district), Legislative Assembly of British Columbia, 1916–1928
 Nelson (New Zealand electorate), 1850–present
 Electoral division of Nelson (Northern Territory), Northern Territory Legislative Assembly, 1990–present
 Electoral division of Nelson (Tasmania), Tasmanian Legislative Council, 1999–present
 Electoral district of Nelson, Western Australian Legislative Assembly, 1890–1950

Schools
 Nelson College, a secondary school for boys in Nelson, New Zealand
 Nelson College for Girls, a secondary school for girls in Nelson, New Zealand
 Nelson High School (disambiguation)

Transportation

Ships
 HMS Nelson (1814), a British "first-rate" warship
 HMS Nelson (1876), a British armoured cruiser
 HMS Nelson (28), a British battleship
 Nelson-class battleship
 USS Nelson (DD-623), an American Gleaves-class destroyer
 HMS Nelson, a stone frigate that partly forms the naval base HMNB Portsmouth

Other transportation
 Nelson (automobile), manufactured from 1917–1921
 Nelson, the original name of the GWR 3031 Class train locomotives

Sports
 Nelson (mascot), the current (male) dog mascot of Portsmouth F.C. 
 Nelson (cricket), a term in the sport of cricket
 Nelson F.C., a football club based in Nelson, Lancashire
 Nelson hold, a type of grappling and wrestling hold
 Nelson Cricket Club, Lancashire, England
 Nelson cricket team, New Zealand
 Nelson Rugby Union, defunct New Zealand rugby team
 Nelson Bays Rugby Union, its successor side
 Nelson Maple Leafs, defunct British Columbia ice hockey team
 Nelson Suburbs FC, New Zealand association football team

Other uses
 Nelson (horse), one of George Washington's favorite horses
 Nelson (cat) Chief Mouser to the Cabinet Office from 1940 to 1946
 Nelson (typeface), a foundry type made by Ludwig & Mayer

See also
 Lord Nelson (disambiguation)
 Nelson rules, a methodology in control theory
 Nelson's (disambiguation)
 Nelsons (disambiguation)
 Nelsen (disambiguation)